LaShonda or Lashonda is a feminine given name. Notable people with the name include:

 LaShonda Katrice Barnett (born 1974), American author, playwright, and radio host
 Lashonda Lester (1975/1976–2017), American standup comedian

Feminine given names